The 50 Greatest Hits is a compilation album by American singer Elvis Presley, originally released on November 18, 2000. It features 50 of Presley's best known songs and was re-released on 11 August 2017 to mark 40 years since his death.

Track listing

Charts

Weekly charts

Year-end charts

Certifications

References

2000 compilation albums
Elvis Presley compilation albums
Compilation albums published posthumously